Kibby may refer to:

People 
 Bill Kibby (1903–1942), British-born Australian Army soldier
 Morgan Kibby (born 1984), American actress and singer-songwriter

Places 
 Kibby Pond, southeast of Bakers Mills, New York
 Kibby Mountain, in Franklin County, Maine

See also 
 Kibbee
 Kibbie (disambiguation)